This is a list of Scottish football transfers featuring at least one 2019–20 Scottish Premiership club or one 2019–20 Scottish Championship club which were completed after the summer 2019 transfer window closed and before the end of the 2019–20 season.

List

See also
 List of Scottish football transfers summer 2019
 List of Scottish football transfers summer 2020

References

Transfers
Scottish
2020 in Scottish sport
2019 winter
2019 in Scottish sport